Andrew Parnell (born 17 February 1954, in Buxton, Derbyshire, England) is an organist and harpsichordist.

As a boy Parnell was a choral scholar at Southwell Minster, where he began organ studies under Kenneth Beard. He won the Organ Scholarship at Christ's College, Cambridge aged 19 and studied under Nicolas Kynaston. He was awarded the Fellowship Diploma of the Royal College of Organists aged 19 and won the Limpus and Shinn prizes in that year's FRCO diploma examinations.

After a spell as Director of Music at St James's Church, Cambridge, he moved to St Albans in 1976 as Assistant Master of the Music to the Cathedral and Abbey Church of St Alban, appointed by Peter Hurford. He was also appointed Master of Music and choirmaster at St Albans School. He founded St Albans Cathedral Girls' Choir (originally the Abbey Girls' Choir) in 1996, which is now a regular part of the worshipping community. From 1983 to 2001 he conducted St Albans Symphony Orchestra. In 2001, after 25 years in St Albans, he moved to Norfolk for a few years, but subsequently returned to live in St Albans where he pursued his freelance organist and recording career.

Andrew now resides in Ely, Cambridgeshire, working closely with Ely Cathedral.

Having helped out as Acting Assistant Organist at 9 cathedrals, Andrew joined the staff at Ely Cathedral as Assistant Director of the Octagon Singers. He is frequently invited to play as soloist or accompanist, and, in 2019 has given recitals at Westminster Cathedral and St Andrew's Hall, Norwich. He also has engagements as organ accompanist in concerts in Godmanchester, St Albans and Sloane Square, London. He currently enjoys his association with Brian Kay and The Really Big Chorus, for whom he has played in the Messiah from Scratch in the Royal Albert Hall, and has travelled to Cologne, Tenerife, Guernsey, Mallorca and Riga. He joins them again in Trieste in 2020.

Andrew directs Ely Choral Society, the Ely Youth Choir and Wymondham Symphony Orchestra, which this season will have performed in 15 varied concerts.

Andrew's compositions, both sacred and secular, have been performed in venues as widespread as St Paul's Cathedral, St Thomas' 5th Avenue in New York, St Petersburg and Krakow. His Fenland Images, premiered in Ely Cathedral in 2017, was included in WSO's concert in the 2019 Wymondham Festival, in which the orchestra was joined by Ely Choral Society.

He is a trustee of the New School of Organ Studies

Recording and performing career
Parnell has accompanied St Albans Cathedral Choir in recordings and radio and television broadcasts and has also accompanied Norwich Cathedral Girls' Choir on tour in the Netherlands, deputised as Assistant Organist at Southwell Minster and at the Cathedrals of Ely, Canterbury and Wakefield, and is conductor of Ely Choral Society, principal conductor of Cambridgeshire Choral Society and Wymondham Symphony Orchestra. He has also made numerous solo recordings on the organ and harpsichord.

He is also frequently heard directing or accompanying the Daily Service on BBC Radio 4, and has accompanied the BBC Singers on BBC Radio 3.

References

External links
Andrew Parnell at Michael Harrold artist management
St Albans Symphony Orchestra 
Cambridgeshire Choral Society 

1954 births
Living people
People from Buxton
English classical organists
British male organists
Cathedral organists
Fellows of the Royal College of Organists
21st-century organists
21st-century British male musicians
Male classical organists